The Canadian Screen Award for Best Achievement in Art Direction/Production Design is awarded by the Academy of Canadian Cinema and Television to the best Canadian film art direction/production design.

1970s

1980s

1990s

2000s

2010s

2020s

See also
Prix Iris for Best Art Direction

References

 
Awards for best art direction
Art direction